Q-commerce, also referred to as quick commerce, is a type of e-commerce where emphasis is on quick deliveries, typically in less than an hour. Q-commerce originally started with food delivery and it still represents the largest chunk of the business. It has quickly expanded to other categories particularly for grocery delivery, medicines, gifts, and apparel etc. Since early 2020, the restrictions imposed due to COVID-19 pandemic gave a major boost to q-commerce as it allowed retailers to remain operational via quick home deliveries. These prolonged restrictions resulted in long term consumer behavior shift towards quick deliveries, and established q-commerce as the third generation of commerce.

Companies in q-commerce include Meituan, Gojek, Grab, Delivery Hero, Glovo, Rappi, GoPuff, Instacart, and Postmates.

History
The evolution of quick commerce started in 2011, with companies like Postmates, but only started to gain scale and traction around 2017 as companies like Delivery Hero and Meituan expanded into the area.  

Initially, delivery time hovered around 60 minutes but by 2019 several companies started local warehouse concepts (cloud stores or dark stores) to drive speed down towards 20 minutes.

Global Trends
The rapidly growing category offers a large selection of products at any time of day and in particular targets  single-person households. It is currently estimated that the Q Commerce market is $300Mn and is expected to grow 10 to 15 times over the next five years to touch $5 Billion.

References 

E-commerce